Swallownest F.C. is an English football club based in Swallownest, Rotherham, South Yorkshire.

History
The club first entered senior league football as Aston in 2006, playing in the South Yorkshire Amateur League (SYAL). They won promotion from Division 1 in their first year and followed that up by winning the SYAL title a year later.

In the summer of 2008 they were admitted to the Sheffield & Hallamshire County Senior League (S&HCSL), starting in Division Two.
They won two successive promotions to reach the County Senior League Premier Division by 2010, when they changed their name to Swallownest Miners Welfare. A previous team representing the Miners Welfare had competed in the Yorkshire League during the 1960s. In their first season at Step 7 of the National League System, the new Miners Welfare FC clinched the County Senior League championship remaining unbeaten all season.

In 2014/15 they applied for promotion to the Northern Counties East League (NCEL) but ultimately failed to pass a ground grading inspection, and in 2015/16 (the year they were renamed as simply Swallownest) they finished in too low a position to attain promotion. Finally, after winning the S&HCSL Premier Division for a second time in 2017, they won promotion to the NCEL Division One.

In the first three seasons in the NCEL Division One Swallownest FC guided by manager Jordan Stocks maintained a top half finish. In December 2020 the club parted company with Stocks and the role was taken up on an interim basis by current player Alex Nightingale. Following a 5-2 win in his first game in charge Nightingale was confirmed as 1st Team Manager.

Season-by-season record

Grounds
The club originally played at the Leonard Kyte ground in the neighbouring village of Aughton. Upon joining the Sheffield & Hallamshire County Senior League in 2008, the club moved to the Swallownest Miners Welfare ground on Sheffield Road, where they have remained since.

Development of the ground between 2014 and 2017 ensured the application for NCEL Division One was successful. The club committee continue to develop sections of the ground each year, increasing seating capacity and the development of spectator facilities.

Match day Parking
Spectator parking is available in the main club car park. Additional parking can be found on road outside the ground.

Honours

League
Sheffield & Hallamshire County Senior League Premier Division
Champions: 2010–11, 2016–17
Sheffield & Hallamshire County Senior League Division 1
Promoted: 2009–10
Sheffield & Hallamshire County Senior League Division 2
Promoted: 2008–09 (champions)
South Yorkshire Amateur League Premier Division
Champions: 2007–08 
South Yorkshire Amateur League Division One
Promoted: 2006–07

Cup
South Yorkshire Amateur League Cup
Runners-up: 2007–08

Records

References

External links
 Official website

Football clubs in England
Football clubs in South Yorkshire
Sheffield & Hallamshire County FA members
Northern Counties East Football League
Sheffield & Hallamshire County Senior Football League
Mining association football teams in England